The September 11 attacks in the United States in 2001 had a significant impact on broadcast and venue entertainment businesses, prompting cancellations, postponements, and changes in content. In the United States and several other countries, planned television screenings of films and fictional programs where terrorism, plane crashes, bombs, or other related disasters that were the primary subject were postponed or cancelled.

Films

Numerous films that were in production were cancelled, and many films were edited. There were various reasons given for the alterations, including keeping material up-to-date, as a gesture of respect for those who died, and to avoid trauma for those emotionally affected by the attack. There are also many films which notably were not edited.

Roughly 45 films were edited or postponed because of the 9/11 attacks.

Edited films

With the World Trade Center removed
 Spider-Man (2002) – A teaser trailer of the film was removed from circulation, as it featured Spider-Man capturing a helicopter filled with criminals in a web spun between the Twin Towers. A poster with the World Trade Center reflected in Spider-Man's eyes was also recalled, while the short teaser trailer of the film also removed the towers from Spider-Man's reflection eye. Sony removed any mentions of the Twin Towers from the teaser images and trailer on the website. A shot of the World Trade Center (WTC) was deleted from the film, but it can be found on the Sony Stock Footage website. Two scenes were added to the film in response to the attacks: in the first, a group of New Yorkers attack the Green Goblin over the Queensboro Bridge, with one saying, "You mess with Spidey, you mess with New York!", and another saying "You mess with one of us, you mess with all of us!". The second, a scene of Spider-Man hanging onto a flagpole with a large American flag, was seen in later trailers and at the end of the film.
 Zoolander (2001) – The WTC was digitally deleted in the film, which was theatrically released nearly three weeks after the attacks.
 Don't Say a Word (2001) – The film was theatrically released nearly three weeks after the attacks, and the filmmakers contemplated delaying its release, but decided against it. However, they cut out and replaced shots of the towers from the edit, such as the opening shot, which shows Brooklyn instead.
 Men in Black II (2002) – It originally featured a climax that included the WTC, but the scene was changed to the Statue of Liberty.
 Changing Lanes (2002) – Director Roger Michell had the WTC towers digitally removed from the opening main title sequence in the film. In the DVD commentary, he admitted that it was a mistake to erase them, and pretend they did not exist.
Mr. Deeds (2002) – Shots of the World Trade Center were partially seen: one was shot in the helicopter for the scene where Longfellow Deeds arrives in New York City, and one was shot in the Upper West Side, which shows the entire Manhattan skyline. The towers were digitally removed in the scene where Deeds and Chuck Cedar play tennis, which was shot on Roosevelt Island in spring 2001.
 Stuart Little 2 (2002) – Shots of the World Trade Center were digitally removed.
Serendipity (2001) — Shots containing the World Trade Center were removed.
 Kissing Jessica Stein (2001) – Shots of the WTC were removed before the film's release.
 People I Know (2002) – Scenes of the WTC were removed, but it can be found on the DVD release in the deleted scenes featurette.
 Armageddon (1998) – The scene in which the World Trade Center gets hit by meteors and catches on fire was edited out of many television broadcasts of the film after the attacks.
 Home Alone 2: Lost in New York (1992) – It features a scene atop the WTC, which was edited out on several television channels. However, as of Christmas 2018, the scene with the WTC was restored.
 King Kong (1976) – As the film involved the title character climbing the World Trade Center, its DVD at the time reflected this scene from the original poster art.

With the World Trade Center added
Some filmmakers have added the World Trade Center to films and television series that are set during periods when the buildings were still standing.
 Miracle (2004) – Set in 1979 and 1980, has a digital World Trade Center on the New York City skyline.
 Munich (2005) –  Features a scene set in 1977 with the Twin Towers in the background.
 Rent (2005) – Includes a shot of the World Trade Center.
 The Killing of John Lennon (2006) and Chapter 27 (2007) – two biography films about Mark David Chapman's murder of John Lennon on December 8, 1980—feature the World Trade Center. In The Killing of John Lennon, the WTC is seen while the footage spins from the Statue of Liberty where Mark David Chapman arrives in New York City from Hawaii and set on December 5, 1980, although the towers were removed where Chapman dances with the woman on the Brooklyn Bridge. In Chapter 27, the World Trade Center is seen in the beginning where Chapman rides in a taxicab on the Brooklyn Bridge, though the towers were removed from the sunset in New York City.
 Madagascar: Escape 2 Africa (2008) – Contains a segment when the animals arrive in New York City, and the original WTC is seen in the distance.
 The Wackness (2008) – The film concludes with a scene depicting the Twin Towers in 1994.
 Watchmen (2009) – The film features the Twin Towers in several scenes.
 Remember Me (2010) – Digital recreations of the WTC are used in the film's last scene.
 Life on Mars shows a digitally-inserted World Trade Center in several episodes.
 Fringe depicted an intact World Trade Center in a parallel universe. The buildings were revealed in the finale of season one.
 A Most Violent Year (2014) – The film shows the WTC in the background of several shots.
 X-Men: Days of Future Past (Rogue Cut version, 2015) – The World Trade Center is seen after Wolverine leaves for Manchester, New York.
 X-Men: Apocalypse (2016) – The World Trade Center towers are seen.
 2:22 (2017) – The film shows the towers in the distance in its opening scene.
 A Beautiful Day in the Neighborhood (2019) – As an establishing shot, the film has the 1998 New York City skyline, including the Twin Towers, rendered in the style of the models seen in the opening of Mister Rogers' Neighborhood.
 The episode "Peter and Lois' Wedding" from Family Guy – the World Trade Center is seen throughout the episode.

Other changes
 E.T. the Extra-Terrestrial (2002 re-release) – The dialogue "You're not going as a terrorist" (spoken by the mother) was replaced with "You're not going as a hippie."
 Meet the Parents (2000, aired on ABC Family) – The scene near the end in which Greg gets into an argument with the airline stewardess and his subsequent interrogation by an airline official removes all references to Greg mentioning the word bomb on the airplane.
 Spy Game (2001) – The level of smoke shown following a bombing was reduced because of its similarity to the smoking WTC wreckage.
 The Time Machine (2002) – A scene where debris from the destroyed moon crashes into a building was edited due to its resemblance to the attacks.
 Lilo & Stitch (2002) – The film originally showed Stitch, Jumba, Pleakley, and Nani hijacking a Boeing 747 to chase down Captain Gantu and rescue Lilo through the streets of Honolulu. However, this scene was changed to show them taking Jumba's spaceship and chasing Gantu around Hawaii's mountains. The original scene was included on the special edition DVD.
The Powerpuff Girls Movie (2002)  – A scene resembling the tragedy, with people falling from a toppling building and being ultimately saved by the Powerpuff Girls, was rethought and adjusted to avoid making a direct reference to the World Trade Center.
 Fox shelved previously scheduled airings of The X-Files movie (1998) and Independence Day (1996) on September 14 and 16, respectively. They were replaced by respective airings of Nine Months (1995) and There's Something About Mary (1998). The Peacemaker (1997) was also removed from ABC on the same day as Independence Day.
Die Another Day (2002) – The film was originally going to end with a North Korean satellite attack on Manhattan, which was moved to the Korean Demilitarized Zone after the attacks.
 The Incredibles (2004) – Early versions of the film featured a scene where Mr. Incredible vents his emotions on an abandoned building, but ends up accidentally damaging a neighboring building as well. It was considered to be too reminiscent of the World Trade Center collapse and was replaced with a scene where Mr. Incredible and Frozone rescue trapped civilians from a burning building.
 Monsters, Inc. (2001) – The film originally depicted a building exploding as part of a decontamination effort against human children, but was replaced with a plasma effect. The filmmakers described the decision to alter the film in the Blu-ray "round-table discussion" bonus feature.
 Sidewalks of New York (2001) – The WTC was removed from the promotional poster, but the buildings remained in the film itself.

Delayed films
 Collateral Damage (2002) – The film was postponed for four months, and features a terrorist bombing in front of a Los Angeles building.
 The Time Machine (2002) – The film was delayed by three months because of an eventually-deleted scene where a meteor shower destroys New York City. 
 Big Trouble (2002) – The film was postponed seven months because it involved a nuclear bomb being smuggled on board an aircraft.

Cancelled films
 A Jackie Chan film called Nosebleed, about a window washer on the WTC who foils a terrorist plot, was due to start filming on September 11, 2001. Snopes questioned the suggestion that this was any kind of "narrow escape", pointing out the uncertain nature of film development and noting "it was almost certainly as part of a plan drawn up and abandoned long before September 2001".
 James Cameron planned to make a sequel to True Lies, but canceled the project after the attacks, saying that "terrorism is no longer something to be taken lightly".
 There were plans to have a sequel to Forrest Gump, but after the attacks, Eric Roth, Robert Zemeckis, and Tom Hanks said that the story was no longer "relevant" and it felt "meaningless".

Non-altered films
Some films released after 9/11 kept scenes of the WTC in them.
 Vanilla Sky (2001) – Director Cameron Crowe retained shots of the buildings in the film's final cut despite the producers asking for them to be removed.
 Donnie Darko (2001) – The film contains scenes in which parts of a plane fall from the sky, and it has been suggested that the film's darker themes were responsible for its poor box office, but it nonetheless went on to become a cult classic in the years following.
 Delivering Milo (2001) – The WTC is seen from Ellis Island, while he rides in the boat.
 Spider-Man – Once Upon a Time The Super Heroes! (2001 documentary) – A shot of the towers was retained as a tribute. It was not edited for the DVD release on June 17, 2002.
 A.I.: Artificial Intelligence (2001) – released less than three months before the attacks, a scene set thousands of years in the future which features a badly damaged WTC was not edited for its video release.
 Death to Smoochy (2002) – The North Tower is seen when Rainbow Randolph is dancing on the small bench in Duane Park. In the DVD commentary, Danny DeVito explained that it was the only shot in the movie that the WTC was in and he designed the shot. It means that this movie was filmed from January to May 2001, four months before the 9/11 attacks.
 Gangs of New York (2002) – The film ends with the New York City skyline containing the Twin Towers. The filmmakers had filmed the shot before the 9/11 attacks and later debated whether to remove the World Trade Center, have the towers dissolve out from the shot to signify their disappearance, or remove the sequence entirely.
Rush Hour 2 (2001) – Several scenes where a bomb explodes at the United States Consulate General were not edited for its video release.

Television

News coverage

The television coverage of the September 11 attacks and their aftermath was the longest uninterrupted news event in U.S. television history, with the major U.S. broadcast networks on the air for 93 continuous hours. From the moment the news was broadcast that the first plane hit the North Tower of the World Trade Center, all programs and commercials were suspended, with all four networks broadcasting uninterrupted news coverage.

The 9/11 attacks were also the first time since the assassination of John F. Kennedy that television networks announced that there would be no television commercials or programs for an indefinite period of several days after the attacks, since it was widely felt that it was an inappropriate time for "fun and entertainment" programs to be shown when so much death and destruction was being seen live on television. During the week of the attacks, the networks' evening news broadcasts nearly doubled its average viewership audience, and it was estimated that American adults watched an average of eight hours of television a day, nearly doubling the average viewership audience. To keep up with the constant flow of information, many news networks began running continuous updates in a news ticker, which soon became a permanent fixture of many networks.

On the day of the attacks and afterwards, news broadcasters scrambled to report accurate information, though erroneous information was occasionally broadcast. An examination of CNN's coverage of September 11, 2001 (which was replayed online, virtually in its entirety, on the fifth anniversary of the attacks in 2006) revealed that after the attack on the Pentagon, the network had also reported that a fire had broken out on the National Mall, and that according to a wire report, a car bomb had exploded in front of the State Department. It also broadcast an interview with a witness to the Pentagon attack who said it was a helicopter (not a plane) that hit the building. CNN was not alone in airing these or similar inaccurate reports, as subsequent examinations of coverage by other networks has shown.

Reaction of various networks
 The major television stations in New York City provided local coverage of the World Trade Center attacks, though they also had to deal with their transmission facilities atop the WTC being destroyed and six station engineers killed in the attacks.
 Some cable networks continued broadcasting their regularly scheduled programming without interruption, particularly those geared toward children's entertainment, such as Nickelodeon and Cartoon Network. Several networks like Food Network, HGTV, along with shopping channels QVC and HSN, paused programming to display still images conveying sympathies and condolences.
 At 12:00pm, Rede Globo broadcast a special edition of Jornal Hoje (afternoon national newscast). Normally the program would air after local newscasts and a sports news show. When Jornal Hoje ended, Globo decided to restart its normal programming for the second time, with occasional breaks for the news division to announce updates about the situation.
 At 8:15pm, Jornal Nacional (Globo's primetime newscast) started a special edition. The program broke the record of most-watched newscast of the year. According to official numbers later released, for each 100 televisions being watched at the time, 74 were tuned into Jornal Nacional. The special edition had William Bonner and Fátima Bernardes as hosts and had the participation of correspondents in New York (live), Washington DC, London and Beirut. Correspondent Jorge Pontual was praised by critics after a memorable report right by the WTC. In October 2002, that edition of the Jornal Nacional was nominated for the 30th International Emmy Awards.

Use of pictures
When asked for her thoughts on the attacks, Laura Bush stated that "we need to be very careful about our children". She warned parents not to let their children see the confronting images of destruction over and over, and recommended that parents turn off the television and do something constructive, reassuring, and calming with their kids.

Programming
The most immediate impact to television was the loss of David Angell, a co-creator and co-executive producer from the NBC show Frasier, who was among the passengers on American Airlines Flight 11.

In the United States, the start of the 2001–2002 television season was put on hold due to the extensive news coverage (several series, such as NBC's Crossing Jordan, were originally scheduled to debut on September 11), with mid-September premieres delayed until later in the month. Late-night talk shows such as The Tonight Show and Late Show with David Letterman were also off the air; Letterman was already dark for the week for a pre-season vacation. Even after regular programming resumed, several talk shows remained off the air for several more days as writers and hosts determined how best to approach the sensitive situation. David Letterman was quoted on CNN as questioning whether he would even continue hosting his show. Ultimately, Letterman, Jay Leno, Jon Stewart, and other talk show hosts based in New York and Los Angeles returned to the airwaves with emotional initial broadcasts, with Letterman punctuating his thoughts by asking his audience how the attacks "made any goddamn sense." This was the second of three instances where the start of the television season was delayed due to issues outside of the control of the major television networks; the other instances were the 1988–89 season (as a result of the 1988 Writers Guild of America strike) and the 2020–21 season (due to television production being halted as a result of the COVID-19 pandemic).

Several TV series, most notably The West Wing and Third Watch, produced special episodes addressing the attacks. Law & Order and its spinoff series all began their fall season premieres with a tribute to the victims. Shows such as the military based JAG and Third Watch (a series about New York City first responders) made major changes to their ongoing storylines to incorporate the event's aftermath.

On September 17, 2001, Politically Incorrect host Bill Maher's guest Dinesh D'Souza disputed President George Bush's label of the terrorists being "cowards", saying that the terrorists were warriors. Maher agreed and, according to a transcript, replied, "We have been the cowards, lobbing cruise missiles from 2,000 miles away. That's cowardly. Staying in the airplane when it hits the building, say what you want about it, it's not cowardly." The comments were widely condemned, and the show was cancelled the following June, which Maher and many others saw as a result of the controversy; however, ABC denied that the controversy was a factor, and said the show was cancelled due to declining ratings. Maher said that the show struggled for advertisers in its final months.

American animator Seth MacFarlane was going to board Flight 11 to Los Angeles, but missed his flight.

Delayed or cancelled entertainment awards shows
 The 53rd Annual Primetime Emmy Awards, scheduled for September 16, were delayed to October 7. However, the U.S. began to bomb Afghanistan on that day, and the Emmy Awards were again postponed. They finally aired on November 4, with a somewhat somber atmosphere after surviving rumors of cancellation. Due to the delay, the event was relocated from the originally scheduled Shrine Auditorium venue to the smaller Shubert Theatre. The 2006 drama Studio 60 on the Sunset Strip featured flashbacks to this time, where two of the characters on the show were fictionally nominated for awards at this event.
 The 2nd Annual Latin Grammy Awards, which was scheduled for September 11, was cancelled promptly after the attacks. After many discussions about rescheduling the ceremony, The Latin Recording Academy determined it would be impossible to do so. Instead, the winners were announced at a press conference on October 30 at the Conga Room. The cancellation of the event cost the organizers an estimate of $2 million in losses. Some of the winners were acknowledged at the 44th Grammy Awards. Furthermore, the attacks influenced the National Academy of Recording Arts and Sciences to hold the 2003 Grammy Awards ceremony in New York City as part of the "healing process".

The postponements and cancellations of various entertainment programs sparked rumors that the Academy of Motion Picture Arts and Sciences were postponing or even canceling the 74th Academy Awards ceremony. However, in a written statement released by president Frank Pierson, he denied any rumors that the attacks would affect the scheduling of the awards presentation saying that "the terrorists will have won" if they cancelled it. Nevertheless, the show went on as planned on March 24, 2002. The security was much tighter than in previous years, and the show had a more somber tone. According to New York Magazine, there were 26 references to the attacks during the telecast.<ref>Giovanni, Joseph: "9/11 by the Numbers", New York Magazine, 16 September 2002, page 54.</ref> On October 16, 2006, the awards event itself was designated a National Special Security Event by the United States Department of Homeland Security.

Reflecting the significant and enduring impact of September 11th on popular culture, months and years after the attacks, events were still impacted, with the 2003 Grammy Awards being held at Madison Square Garden instead of Staples Center as planned. Blockbuster Entertainment terminated their awards ceremony permanently shortly after the second delay of the Emmys.

Other changes
 The Absolutely Fabulous episode "Paris" had a joke about the Taliban's destruction of the Buddhas of Bamiyan removed from its original broadcast on September 14, 2001. However, the material was restored on home media and streaming versions of the episode.
 In the Friends episode "The One Where Rachel Tells...", Chandler and Monica could not get on their flight for their honeymoon because Chandler joked about a bombing in the airport. After the attacks, the story was rewritten and reshot. As the show was set in New York, a disclaimer reading "Dedicated to the People of New York City" was added to the end of the episode "The One After 'I Do'", which was the first episode of the series to be broadcast after the attacks. In several subsequent episodes, Joey and other members of the crew are seen wearing NYPD and FDNY apparel; Joey is seen wearing a T-shirt that says "Captain Billy Burke", referring to an NYC firefighter who died in the attack.
 The opening credits of The Sopranos's first three seasons featured a shot of the Twin Towers visible in Tony Soprano's rearview mirror. It was replaced with a generic shot beginning in the show's fourth season.
 New material was quickly added to Sesame Street following the attacks to address issues raised. The first episode of the season involves a grease fire at Hooper's Store which traumatizes Elmo until he meets some real-life firefighters. Big Bird has to deal with his xenophobic pen pal Gulliver, who does not believe birds should be friendly to other species.
 The syndicated version of the Married... with Children episode "Get Outta Dodge" features a scene of two Arabs with a ticking bomb at the front door of Al Bundy's house offering to buy his Dodge clunker car for $40 and asking for directions to the Sears Tower.
 Law & Order: Special Victims Unit had their opening credits modified at the start of their third season on September 28 to remove an establishing shot of the World Trade Center.
 The Simpsons episode "The City of New York vs. Homer Simpson", which premiered roughly four years before the attacks and was partially set at the World Trade Center, was temporarily pulled from syndication by some carriers.
 In the Family Guy episode "Road to Rhode Island" (which aired a year before the attacks), Osama bin Laden distracts a security guard at the airport while the X-ray machine detects weapons. This scene was cut after the September 11 attacks and was also removed from the Family Guy: Volume 1 DVD; however, the episode remains intact on the Family Guy: The Freakin' Sweet Collection DVD. The episode "A Fish out of Water" was originally scheduled to premiere on September 12, 2001, but was delayed to September 19 following the attacks.
 The King of the Hill episodes "Propane Boom" and "Death of a Propane Salesman" were temporarily pulled from syndication for the remainder of September, due to the depiction of the explosion of the Mega Lo Mart and the aftermath that followed.
 The SpongeBob SquarePants episode "Just One Bite" originally featured a scene in which Squidward Tentacles attempts to get to the "Patty Vault" by bypassing the Krusty Krab's security system, which consists of a bucket of gas and a match that eventually burns him. Despite this scene being removed after the episode's initial broadcast on October 5, 2001, it remains distributed internally among the fanbase. The episode re-aired in 2002 with the original scene replaced with a zoom-in towards the "Patty Vault" in the back of the Krusty Krab. This change was initially thought to have been made either out of respect the victims of the September 11 attacks (which occurred less than a month before the episode aired), or to prevent children from attempting to use and/or ignite gas. However, in 2018, Vincent Waller confirmed on Twitter that it was ultimately due to Nickelodeon, the show's network, being against the idea of a gag involving a match and gasoline.
 The Invader Zim episode "Door to Door" was delayed from airing in the United States and edited to remove some scenes of a burning city after an Irken invasion. While the unedited version of the episode was aired in Australia, only the edited version has been released on DVD.
 The Only Fools and Horses episode "The Sky's The Limit" was temporarily removed from repeat showings due to the final scene showing a plane nearly crashing into Nelson Mandela House.

TV shows with the WTC digitally added
 Selena: The Series showed the Twin Towers in two episodes: one with the Grammys as Selena Quintanilla was with her husband Chris Perez and sister Suzette, along with the latter's husband. Another episode called "When All the World is Sleeping" had the same towers seen again, but not before Selena's death.

Music and radio
 Program directors from radio stations throughout the United States retooled their playlists in response to the attacks. Common changes included the heavy rotation of songs such as "God Bless the USA" by Lee Greenwood and Whitney Houston's rendition of "The Star-Spangled Banner" from Super Bowl XXV. Meanwhile, songs such as U2's "Sunday Bloody Sunday" and Dave Matthews Band's "Crash Into Me" were excluded from playlists. Additionally, Clear Channel (now known as iHeartMedia) came under scrutiny for distributing a list of 150 potentially sensitive songs that were not recommended for broadcast immediately after the attacks.
  NPR's weekly comedic news quiz show Wait Wait... Don't Tell Me! did not record or broadcast a show for the weekend of September 15–16.
 Christian rap metal band P.O.D. released their album Satellite on September 11, 2001, spurring success for the album and its lead single "Alive", which was seen as having a positive message in the aftermath of the attacks. Other bands associated with genres such as nu metal and rap metal experienced a downturn in sales due to the attacks; these genres continued to decline in popularity in the following years.
 According to Arrogant Worms band member Trevor Strong, the song "Worst Seat on the Plane" was never performed live due to Idiot Road (the album it was featured on) being released on September 18, 2001.
 American alternative rock band Jimmy Eat World voluntarily changed the name of their album Bleed American, which was released on July 18, 2001, out of concern that the title may be misinterpreted. It was re-released as the eponymous Jimmy Eat World, and its title track was renamed "Salt Sweat Sugar". In 2008, a deluxe version of the album was released, reverting both the album and song to their original Bleed American title.
 Hungarian composer Robert Gulya, who lived in the United States from 2000 to 2002, began to work on a guitar concerto shortly after the September 11 attacks. Gulya chose a theme for the concerto's first movement, which is reminiscent of the terror attacks. 
 The cover artwork of Dream Theater's live album Live Scenes from New York, released on September 11, 2001, originally depicted the skyline of New York City in flames. The album was recalled and re-released with a different cover. The band later performed "Sacrificed Sons" on the album Octavarium as a tribute to the victims of the attacks. Keyboardist Jordan Rudess even did the album 4NYC as a charity album for the tragedy. The band changed the name of one song from their 2002 album Six Degrees of Inner Turbulence: "The Great Debate", which discusses stem-cell research controversies, was originally titled "Conflict at Ground Zero" based on the lyrics in the chorus, but was renamed as news reports began to refer to the site of the attacks as "Ground Zero". The band was in a Manhattan studio conducting final mixes of the album on the day in question.
 English rock band Bush changed the name of the lead single off their 2001 album Golden State from "Speed Kills" to "The People That We Love". Also changed was the original cover art for the album, which featured a commercial airplane.
 The San Francisco Symphony continued with a previously planned program of Mahler's 6th Symphony, the "Tragic," on September 12–15. The subsequent recording was highly acclaimed and garnered the 2003 Grammy Award for Best Orchestral Performance.
 Janet Jackson postponed a concert in Tampa, Florida, scheduled for the day, and cancelled the entire European leg of her All for You Tour due to travel concerns after the attacks.
 Before the 9/11 attacks, American DJ and media personality Khaled Mohamed Khaled often referred to himself as "DJ Khaled - The Arab Attack" before dropping the tag line out of concern about offending victims.
 The American compact disc release of The Strokes' debut album, Is This It, was delayed from September 25 to October 9 and had its track list amended, with the song "New York City Cops" being removed and replaced with the newly written track "When It Started"

Theme parks
 The Walt Disney World attraction The Timekeeper, a 360-degree film presentation that featured a panoramic view of New York City (including the Twin Towers) closed on September 11, 2001, and updated the scene of New York City so that the titular character was sent to 2000, a year before the attacks, which caused all references to the WTC to be removed. The attraction closed five years later.

Sports
Many major sporting events in North America were cancelled. These included:
 National Football League (NFL): In the wake of the attacks, the NFL's week 2 games (September 16 and 17) were postponed and rescheduled to the end of the regular season (the weekend of January 6 and 7, 2002). The playoffs began 5 days later on January 12 and ended on February 3, 2002 with the Super Bowl, making it the first time the NFL's championship game was played in the month of February.
 Major League Baseball (MLB): Major League Baseball Commissioner Bud Selig called off games for one day, extended cancellations for three days, then eventually postponed all games through September 16, 2001. The New York Mets' home series against the Pittsburgh Pirates from September 17–19 was moved to Pittsburgh due to security concerns, with the Mets functioning as the series' designated home team. The games were tacked onto the end of the regular season, delaying the postseason until October 4. As a result, the 2001 World Series became the first World Series to extend into November. This was the third time in MLB history that games were cancelled due to war or national security reasons. Games were previously cancelled on D-Day, and the 1918 season was shortened due to World War I.
 All Minor League Baseball championship series were cancelled. Teams that had led their respective series were awarded league championships, or teams which were scheduled to play in such series (such as the Midwest League, which utilizes half-season championships to position the championship series) were awarded co-championships.
 The Major League Soccer (MLS)'s final two weeks of the 2001 season were cancelled, with some teams only playing 26 or 27 matches instead of the planned 28. The playoffs, whose spots were already decided, were played as scheduled, beginning on September 20 and ending with the MLS Cup on October 21.
 The remaining three matches of the 2001 Women's U.S. Cup, featuring the United States women's national soccer team, were cancelled.
 NCAA Division I college football games originally scheduled to be played on September 13 and 15, 2001 were called off.
 USA Cycling cancelled the BMC Software Tour of Houston, a key event in that year's Pro Cycling Tour that had been scheduled for September 16. The decision was made in spite of athletes, staff, and equipment being actively en route to Houston from the inaugural San Francisco Grand Prix, which was held on September 9.
 The Félix Trinidad vs. Bernard Hopkins world Middleweight championship boxing fight, which was to take place on September 15 at Madison Square Garden in New York, was postponed until September 29 due to the attacks. Also, a wrestling show was cancelled at the Madison Square Garden around the same date.

The following overseas sports event was delayed:
 The UEFA Champions League and UEFA Cup matches that were scheduled for September 12 and 13 were postponed to October 10 and September 20, 2001, respectively. Matches scheduled on the September 11 proceeded for logistical reasons, with a minute's silence observed and black armbands worn at the matches.

Sporting events that were not delayed despite the attacks include:
 The 2001 American Memorial was a Championship Auto Racing Teams motor race held four days after the attacks at the EuroSpeedway Lausitz. It was not delayed, but was renamed from "German 500" by CART following the aftermath of the attacks.
Formula One's governing body, the Fédération Internationale de l'Automobile, announced that the 2001 Italian Grand Prix would proceed as scheduled. Ferrari president Luca di Montezemolo said that his team would approach the race as a normal racing event instead of a traditional Ferrari festival. Furthermore, di Montezemolo stated Formula One should continue its normal schedule and not cancel races. The Automobile Club d'Italia urged fans and spectators to behave "in keeping with the gravity of the situation and in collective participation in the pain of American citizens." Podium celebrations were cancelled and all pre-race ceremonies including a flypast by the Italian Tricolour Arrows display team were called off. Three teams altered their car's liveries as a mark of respect. Ferrari stripped their cars of all advertising and painted their nose cones black, Jaguar fitted black engine covers to their R2 cars on Saturday morning, and Jordan sponsor Deutsche Post replaced its branding with the American flag on the Jordan cars' engine covers on Sunday morning. Michael Schumacher was reluctant to take part in the race, and said in 2002 that he felt it was a "bad sign" to be driving after the September 11 attacks.

Video games
 The release of Grand Theft Auto III was delayed almost a month to make last-minute changes, since the game was set in a city loosely based on New York City. Development was also delayed due to Rockstar's offices being based near Ground Zero. The paint scheme of the city's police cars was changed from a blue-and-white design reminiscent of the New York City Police Department to a black-and-white design reminiscent of the Los Angeles Police Department. Other relatively minor changes included altering an AI plane's flight path which went near skyscrapers, and removing a few lines of pedestrian dialogue and talk radio.
 Syphon Filter 3's cover art was changed before release. It originally had Gabe Logan, viewed from an angle, pointing a gun at the camera with a look of anger while Lian swung into frame, guns a-blazing and with the American flag prominently displayed. It was changed to a generic head-view of Gabe and Lian.
 Activision halted production of Spider-Man 2: Enter Electro in order to remove references to buildings resembling the Twin Towers.
 An art designer for the PlayStation 2 game Ace Combat 04: Shattered Skies realized an image that was about to release on the game's promotional website, depicting a battleship sinking near a populated cityscape, looked similar to the smoke plume from the Twin Towers' collapse. The designer discussed this with the staffer in charge of the website, and erased the city buildings from the image. Namco also suspended its broadcast of a Japanese TV spot for the game.
 Eternal Darkness: Sanity's Requiem was delayed as Joseph De Molay, a Templar Knight during the crusades, was removed from the game. Textures that had Arabic writing were also removed.
 Metal Wolf Chaos was not localized into other languages and remained unreleased outside of Japan due to the political climate that followed the attacks. However, it was eventually re-released worldwide as Metal Wolf Chaos XD in 2019.
 Metal Gear Solid 2: Sons of Liberty, which was released in North America and Japan two months after the attack, featured the Pentagon and the World Trade Center during its climax. After the Sept. 11 attacks, a scene showing the destruction of the Statue of Liberty and parts of Manhattan was cut from the game. Dialogue about terrorists targeting Manhattan was also removed.
The Dreamcast game Propeller Arena'' was completed and due to be released on September 19th, 2001, but was cancelled and never officially released. The video game was about dogfighting in planes and one level takes place around a city of skyscrapers.

Other
 Mad magazine's issue No. 411 was already at the printer with a gag front cover depicting the mascot Alfred E. Neuman having taken a wrong turn away from the New York Marathon route (an event occurring in October, when the issue was to be released) and jogging into a murder scene, where he cluelessly broke through yellow crime scene tape in triumph. The cover, which depicted downtown Manhattan and a corpse, was no longer appropriate in light of the September 11 attacks, but the magazine had just one deadline day to produce a replacement cover. This was accomplished with a closely cropped headshot of Neuman, with his trademark tooth gap filled in by a small American flag.
 The 2001 Boshears Skyfest was cancelled due to closed airspace following the attacks.
 Broadway theatre went dark until September 13, 2001, when shows resumed with dimmed marquees.
 Toys "R" Us in Times Square sold a Barbie doll exclusive to this location in 2001. The initial release featured a depiction of the Twin Towers on its packaging, but was revised to remove them following the September 11 attacks.

See also
List of cultural references to the September 11 attacks
Cultural influence of the September 11 attacks

References

Entertainment
Censorship